Liane M. Sorenson (born August 13, 1947) is an American politician who served in the Delaware House of Representatives from the 12th district from 1992 to 1994 and in the Delaware Senate from the 6th district from 1994 to 2012. She was a Republican, lived in Hockessin, and represented New Castle County.

References

1947 births
Living people
Republican Party members of the Delaware House of Representatives
Republican Party Delaware state senators